Philip Mok Kwok-tai is a professor of electrical engineering at the Hong Kong University of Science and Technology. He was named Fellow of the Institute of Electrical and Electronics Engineers (IEEE) in 2014 "for contributions to the design of analog power-management integrated circuits".

References

External links 

Fellow Members of the IEEE
Living people
Hong Kong engineers
Year of birth missing (living people)